is a Japanese economist who has studied regional science and Urban economics and International Trade, Spatial Economy (New Economic Geography). He is a professor at Konan University and an adjunct professor at Institute of Economic Research, Kyoto University.

Fujita majored in urban planning as an undergraduate at Kyoto University. He studied regional science in University of Pennsylvania under Walter Isard and obtained a Ph.D.(in Regional Science) from University of Pennsylvania in 1972. He taught at University of Pennsylvania for about 20 years, and has been the faculty of Institute of Economic Research (KIER) Kyoto University since 1995, where he served as Director in 1999. He was the President of Institute of Developing Economies during 2003 to 2007, and proposed a basic concept of Economic Research Institute for ASEAN and East Asia to JETRO and METI. In 2007, he became President and Chief Research Officer of the Research Institute of Economy, Trade and Industry.

Fujita is known as one of the pioneers of New Economic Geography, as well as Paul Krugman. Fujita is the recipient of the 1983 Tord Palander Prize, the 1998 Walter Isard Award in regional science, and was also awarded the first Alonso Prize, alongside Paul Krugman.

Selected works

Books
 
 
 
 
A revised edition:

Journals articles

External links
 Fellow profile at RIETI
 Researcher profile at Institute of Economic Research Kyoto University(KIER)
 Institute of Developing Economies(IDE)

1943 births
Living people
People from Yamaguchi Prefecture
Japanese geographers
20th-century  Japanese  economists
Regional economists
Kyoto University alumni
University of Pennsylvania alumni
Academic staff of Kyoto University
University of Pennsylvania faculty
Academic staff of Konan University
Members of the Japan Academy
Presidents of the Japanese Economic Association
Fellows of the Econometric Society